Águas do Cuiabá Ecological Station, formerly the Águas do Cuiabá State Park, is an ecological station in the state of Mato Grosso, Brazil, a fully protected conservation unit in the cerrado biome. There was controversy about the acquisition of land to expand the unit's area when it was made an ecological station.

Location

The ecological station covers parts of the municipalities of Nobres (82%) and Rosário Oeste (18%) in the state of Mato Grosso.
It is contained within the Cabeceiras do Rio Cuiabá Environmental Protection Area.
It is in the cerrado biome, with about 57% pioneer formations of savannah contact and 43% savannah.

History

The Águas do Cuiabá State Park  was created on 10 June 2002.
The Cuiabá River was badly contaminated with garbage and raw sewage.
Creation of the park by governor Rogério Salles was part of a program to improve its water quality.

The park was administered by the Mato Grosso Secretary of State for the Environment.
The purpose was to ensure protection of water resources and viability of movement of species of native fauna, preserve significant samples of ecosystems in the area, and provide controlled opportunities for public use, education and scientific research.

The state park was reclassified as an ecological station on 13 November 2014, with redefined boundaries, now covering .
The decree was made by governor Silval Barbosa during the last days of his administration.
An area of  owned by doctor Filinto Correa da Costa was added.
The value of the small addition was questionable, since it was below rather than above the park, and only contained one spring.
A subsequent audit found various irregularities in the purchase.

Notes

Sources

2002 establishments in Brazil
Ecological stations of Brazil
Protected areas of Mato Grosso
Protected areas established in 2002
Cerrado